Brucite is the mineral form of magnesium hydroxide, with the chemical formula Mg(OH)2. It is a common alteration product of periclase in marble; a low-temperature hydrothermal vein mineral in metamorphosed limestones and chlorite schists; and formed during serpentinization of dunites. Brucite is often found in association with serpentine, calcite, aragonite, dolomite, magnesite, hydromagnesite, artinite, talc and chrysotile.

It adopts a layered CdI2-like structure with hydrogen-bonds between the layers.

Discovery
Brucite was first described in 1824 by François Sulpice Beudant and named for the discoverer, American mineralogist, Archibald Bruce (1777–1818). A fibrous variety of brucite is called nemalite. It occurs in fibers or laths, usually elongated along [1010], but sometimes [1120] crystalline directions.

Occurrence
A notable location in the U.S. is Wood's Chrome Mine, Cedar Hill Quarry, Lancaster County, Pennsylvania. Yellow, white and blue Brucite with a botryoidal habit was discovered in Qila Saifullah District of Province Baluchistan, Pakistan. And then in a later discovery Brucite also occurred in the Bela Ophiolite of Wadh, Khuzdar District, Province Baluchistan, Pakistan. Brucite has also occurred from South Africa, Italy, Russia, Canada, and other localities as well but the most notable discoveries are the US, Russian and Pakistani examples.

Industrial applications
Synthetic brucite is mainly consumed as a precursor to magnesia (MgO), a useful refractory insulator.  It finds some use as a flame retardant because it thermally decomposes to release water in a similar way to aluminium hydroxide and mixtures of huntite and hydromagnesite. It also constitutes a significant source of magnesium for industry. Although generally deemed safe, brucite can be contaminated with naturally occurring asbestos fibers.

Magnesium attack of cement and concrete 
When cement or concrete are exposed to Mg2+, the neoformation of brucite, an expansive material, may induce mechanical stress in the hardened cement paste or may clog the porous system creating a buffering effect and delaying deterioration of the CSH phase into MSH phase. The exact magnitude of impact that brucite has over cement paste is still debatable. Prolonged contact between sea water or brines and concrete may induce durability issue although high concentrations are required for this effect, which are rare to find in nature.

The use of dolomite as aggregate in concrete can also cause magnesium attack and should be avoided.

Gallery

See also
List of minerals
List of minerals named after people
Portlandite, Ca(OH)2

References

Further reading

Magnesium minerals
Hydroxide minerals
Cement
Concrete
Trigonal minerals
Minerals in space group 164
Luminescent minerals